Samuel or Sam Ward may refer to:

 Samuel Ward (banker) (1786–1839), American banker
 Samuel Ward (field hockey) (born 1990), British field hockey player
 Samuel Ward (footballer) (1906–?), Scottish footballer
 Samuel Ward (ice hockey) (born 1995), Swedish professional ice hockey goaltender 
 Samuel Ward (lobbyist) (1814–1884), American political lobbyist and gourmet
 Samuel Ward (minister) (1577–1640), English Puritan minister of Ipswich
 Samuel Ward (Rhode Island politician) (1725–1776), governor of the Colony of Rhode Island and Providence Plantations and a delegate to the Continental Congress
 Samuel Ward (scholar) (1572–1643), English academic at Cambridge
 Samuel Ward (taster) (1732–1820), painted by Joseph Wright of Derby but known for being Bonnie Prince Charlie's taster
 Samuel Ward Jr. (1756–1832), American Revolutionary soldier and politician
 Samuel A. Ward (1847–1903), American organist and composer
 Samuel Baldwin Ward (1842–1915), American surgeon
 Samuel Gray Ward (1817–1907), American poet, Transcendentalist, banker, and patron of the arts
 Samuel Ringgold Ward (1817–c. 1860), American abolitionist and newspaper editor
 Samuel Ward, the co-composer of "Tell Her", a song sung by Frank Sinatra on his album That's Life
 Sam Ward (footballer, born 1880) (1880–1968), English footballer

See also
 Samuel Ward Arts and Technology College, Haverhill, Suffolk
 Samuel Ward King (1786–1851), Governor of Rhode Island